The King City Rustler is a publication that serves King City in southern Monterey County, California. The newspaper covers local news, sports, events, business, community and agriculture. The King City Rustler was purchased in July 2019 by California publisher New SV Media, whose products also include the Greenfield News, Soledad Bee,  Gonzales Tribune, Gilroy Dispatch, Morgan Hill Times and Hollister Free Lance. Prior to that, it was owned for 23 years by the Illinois-based News Media Corporation, which specializes in community newspapers. It is published every Wednesday with an estimated circulation of 2,850.
In 2017, Ryan Cronk was named editor and he is the current managing editor.

History 
The King City Rustler was first published May 11, 1901. It was originally published by Frederick Godfrey Vivian under Vivian & Co. was owned by the Vivian-Casey family, passing from founder Fred Vivian to his daughter Beatrice Vivian Casey and grandson Harry Casey until 1995, when it was sold to News Media Corporation.

Founder Fred Vivian was a scribe whose dream was to bring the Salinas Valley under irrigation. He first decided to publish a sheet on the irrigation prospects of King City and the surrounding area. He was known as "Visionary Vivian" and often offended the local land barons whose land grants he dreamed of cutting up and turning into small farms. Due to his efforts and the publication of a special "Irrigation Edition" of the paper, Vivian was appointed to membership on the state advisory board in 1911 and attended the Irrigation Congress in Chicago. Today, the publication maintains a "Focus on Agriculture" section.

In 1929, the King City Rustler became a bi-weekly publication.

Awards 
Founder Fred Vivian and grandson Harry Casey are both members of the California Newspaper Hall of Fame.

References

Weekly newspapers published in California